Juan Fernando Quintero Paniagua (born 18 January 1993) is a Colombian professional footballer who plays as an attacking midfielder for Atlético Junior and the Colombia national team. 

He has been mentioned among the more coveted young players in European football by The Times of London. At the age of 19, Quintero already started to receive praise for his impressive performances during his time in Italy. During his time of the 2013 South American Youth Championship, he has been recognized as not only one of the most promising youth aspects from only South America, but the world.

Quintero has represented Colombia since he was 19, making his official debut in 2012 against Cameroon. At the 2013 South American Youth Championships, he led Colombia to their third title while voted as the tournament's MVP for contributing more than any other player for his respective nation. He also took part in the 2013 FIFA U-20 World Cup in Turkey where he gained more praise for his talents after creating a huge impact in the tournament. Quintero went on to represent Colombia in the 2014 FIFA World Cup in Brazil, where he scored his first world cup goal against Côte d'Ivoire in a group stage match on 19 June 2014. In the 2018 FIFA World Cup he scored against Japan, becoming the first Colombian to score in two FIFA World Cup competitions.

His overall size and style of play as well as his left-foot has led him to be compared to Lionel Messi.

Club career

Envigado
Born in Medellín, Colombia, he joined the youth squad for Envigado after an impressive performance during a youth tournament that took place in Medellin.

Atlético Nacional
Quintero joined the ranks of Atlético Nacional during 2011.

Loan to Pescara
He then joined the ranks of Serie A Pescara months after joining Nacional, wasting no time in impressing European scouts.

It was reported in early 2013 that Inter Milan and Udinese have confirmed their bidding interest. Although Udinese is the only club to have made an official bid.

In early April 2013, it was reported that Quintero suffered an injury and would be out for a month.

In mid May 2013, Quintero posted on Twitter 'good bye and thank you' to Pescara, hinting that he was to leave in the Italian side in the summer. While Pescara claimed that he has not been 'sold', it hinted Quintero's desire to leave the club overall.

Porto
Quintero joined Porto from Pescara for €5 million, with the Italian club retaining 50% of the economic rights. Quintero signed a four-year contract with a release clause of €40 million.

Quintero made his first full debut appearance in the 2013 Emirates Cup against Napoli. He assisted Porto's first goal.

2013–14 season

Quintero's first 'official' match with Porto began with the 2013 Supertaça Cândido de Oliveira, where he came on as a sub after 76 minutes when Porto were already ahead by 3-0. Porto went on to win the match, thus giving Quintero's very first silverware not only in Europe, but in his club career.

Quintero debut in his first league match for the club against Vitoria Setubal, coming on as a sub and scoring less than a minute later. Quintero provided his first assist for the club two weeks later against P. Ferreira in a 1–0 victory. In a match against Vitória de Guimarães, Quintero drew a penalty that was successfully converted, thus granting him an assist in a 1–0 home victory. Quintero came in on the 90th minute against F.C. Arouca where he was then fouled near the box. He then converted an impressive free kick goal, seconds after only coming in.

In late October, Quintero suffered a hamstring injury, expecting to be out for a month.

Following his return in December, Quintero requested to play with the B-squad in order to keep his fitness up if he's not to get guarantee minutes with the A-squad.

After a long period of matches spent solely on the bench, or coming on as a late substitute during Paulo Fonseca's time as manager, averaging around 20 minutes per game in the league, Quintero found his way back into the team under new manager Luís Castro. Quintero's next significant performance was against Napoli in the Europa League, where he came close to scoring his first goal in European competition, when a Napoli defender's clearance rebounded off his leg and hit the post.

Quintero scored his third goal of the season against Belenenses, coming on as a half time substitute and setting up several opportunities for teammate and fellow countryman Jackson Martínez, but eventually it would be Quintero who decided the game with the only goal in a 1–0 victory. Teammate Líca provided a low cross which was parried out by Belenenses goalkeeper Matt Jones, and Quintero came in for the rebound, driving a low shot underneath Matt Jones and in the back of the net.

Quintero made his first 90-minute appearance for Porto on 6 April 2014, in a home match against Académica. He provided somewhat of an assist, again for Jackson Martinez, when he was fouled in the box in the 38th minute, which resulted in a converted Jackson Martínez penalty. Quintero then scored his fourth goal of the season a week later, in the 91st minute in a 3–1 victory over S.C. Braga, after a counterattack which he started.

On 21 April, Quintero came on as a second-half substitute against fellow northerners Rio Ave and made a significant impact to the match. He was involved in all three of the goals, but only got one direct assist. A chipped through ball to Jackson Martinez resulted in him being brought down for a penalty, which Martínez scored. Next, another chipped through ball to Héctor Herrera resulted in a headed goal. The third goal of the game came from FC Porto right back Danilo, who scored a deflected free kick after Quintero had been fouled just outside the box.

2014–15 season
Quintero missed Porto's first league game of the season due to a death in the family, but returned to the Porto squad for the next league match versus Paços de Ferreira. Coming on for the injured Cristian Tello, he provided the assist, yet again for fellow Colombian Jackson Martínez, for the only goal in a 1–0 victory for Porto.

Quintero scored his first goal of the season against F.C. Arouca from long distance, Porto ended up winning 0-5.

On 16 December 2014, Porto purchased the remaining 50% economic rights of Quintero from Pescara for €4.5 million, giving them complete ownership of him.

Loan to Rennes

2015–16
Quintero signed a one-season length loan with Ligue 1 side Rennes. Quintero made his debut against OGC Nice, coming on as a sub and providing an assist in a 1–4 loss. Quintero would eventually score his first goal for the club in the match against SM Caen, resulting in a 1–1 draw.

Quintero stated in an interview that he intended to return to Porto after his loan ended despite rumors linking him to a stay.

Loan to Independiente Medellín

2017
On 13 September 2016 it was reported that Quintero would return to the top flight Colombian league on loan to Independiente Medellín from Porto on a contract through December 2017.

Loan to River Plate
On 24 January 2018, Quintero joined Argentine club River Plate on loan for one year. The deal reportedly was settled in €300,000 and included a buyout clause of €5 million. He got the number 8, and scored the winning goal for River Plate against Boca Juniors. He also made the famous pass to Pity Martinez to seal the deal 3-1. He's got a tattoo on the calf of his leg commemorating the occasion: River Plate's 4th Copa Libertadores.

River Plate

2019
River Plate made the transfer for Quintero for the amount of €3.5 million. Then, JuanFer took the number 10 after the departure of Pity Martinez to the MLS. He renewed his contract to June 2022 and included a buyout clause of €22 million. In August 2019, he was nominated for the 2019 FIFA Puskás Award for his goal scored against Racing Club. His goal eventually finished third, behind second place Lionel Messi, and winner Dániel Zsóri.

Junior FC

2023
Atlético Junior announced on January 13, that the club had reached an agreement with the player, pending medical exams, which the player passed the next day. The player came as a free agent, with a contract for one year. The player was presented on January 15 to a 40.000 crowd.

International career

Youth

2013 South American Youth Championship
Quintero was called to represent Colombia wearing the number 10 jersey at the 2013 South American Youth Championship. In the first match against Paraguay, he was voted man of the match after an impressive display setting up the 1–0 victory goal. In the match against a powerful Chile team, Quintero scored a penalty although Colombia lost 2–1. In the match against Bolivia, Quintero assisted four of the six goals in a 6–0 victory. In the final group stage match against Argentina, Colombia had already qualified thus he did not play until the second half where he scored with an amazing 50 yard free kick despite losing the match 2–3.

In the first match of the final round, Quintero scored again from an impressive distance in a 2–1 victory over Ecuador. This brought his goal tally to three and his assist tally to four. Quintero scored with a penalty against Peru in a 1–0 allowing Colombia to qualify for the 2013 FIFA U-20 World Cup in Turkey. In the final match against Paraguay who were also Colombia's very first opponent in the U20 South American Youth Championships, he scored a goal in a 2–1 victory where Colombia won the Youth Championships in South America for the third time. In total, Quintero had scored 5 goals and assisted 4 making him MVP of the championship for contributing more than any other player in the tournament.

Quintero was set to join the U20 squad again for the 2013 Toulon Tournament, but Pescara refused to allow him to his call-up. Prior to the U-20 World Cup, Quintero scored with an impressive free kick in a friendly against the U-20 squad of France.

2013 U-20 FIFA World Cup

Quintero played an entertaining opening match performance of the U-20 FIFA World Cup that was held in Turkey. He made impressive shots with his free kicks as well as creating impressive chances. He set up Colombia's goal in the 78th minute where the game ended 1–1. In the match against host nation Turkey, Quintero scored a wonderful goal from outside the box (20 yards), winning the game 1–0 and allowing Colombia to top the group. In the last group match against El Salvador, Quintero assisted the first goal and sealed the victory with an amazing 25 yard goal, allowing Colombia to win 3–0 and win the group. Quintero then played in the next match against South Korea, and managed to save Colombia into extra time with an impressive free kick in the last few seconds of full-time. However, Colombia went on to lose on penalties eventually where he scored one in a 7–8 loss. Despite Colombia failing to progress, Quintero was praised as the best player in the group stages.

His goal against El Salvador was later voted as best goal of the tournament.

Olympics Squad
Quintero expressed great interest in representing Colombia in 2016 for the Olympics in Brazil.

In February 2016, Quintero was called up to play back to back friendlies against Honduras. He made his debut in the first match resulting in a 1–1 draw. Days later in the second match, he scored with a free kick in a 2-2 draw.

Senior
In 2012, Quintero was called for the 2014 FIFA World Cup qualifiers against Peru and Ecuador, without making an appearance. He made his international debut in a friendly match against Cameroon later in the same year.

2014 World Cup and Friendlies
On 2 June 2014, Quintero was named in Colombia's 23-man squad for the 2014 FIFA World Cup and assigned the number 20 shirt.
He made his World Cup debut against Ivory Coast in the group stage, coming on for Victor Ibarbo in the 53rd minute, and scored his first international goal to decide the 2–1 win for Los Cafeteros.

In a friendly against Bahrain, Quintero assisted Radamel Falcao's first goal in a 6–0 victory.

2018 World Cup
In May 2018, he was named in Colombia's preliminary 35 man squad for the 2018 World Cup in Russia. On 19 June 2018, he scored in the opening game against Japan with a free kick under the wall to tie the match 1–1 that ended in a 2–1 defeat. On 24 June 2018, Quintero played 73 minutes in Colombia's 3–0 victory over Poland and assisted to Radamel Falcao's goal in the 70th minute of the game. Four days later on 28 June 2018, he played 90 minutes of Colombia's final game in the group stage and provided the winning assist to Yerry Mina's goal off of a corner kick to secure first place in group H. On 3 July 2018, he played 88 minutes in the round of 16 game against England. He did not provide any goals or assists and Colombia went on to lose the game 3–4 on penalties. His goal against Japan was voted the second best goal of the tournament, after Benjamin Pavard's goal against Argentina.

Style of play

Quintero is well known for his creativity for playmaking and as a supportive player in general. His ball control and dribbling has stood him out from most players his age as well as his free kicks, which he has shown to be profound in. Left footed, Quintero is sometimes considered to be another 'James Rodríguez' due to their similar traits (as well as being only 2 years younger, while also playing for the youth national squads of Colombia after Rodriguez's time), although Rodriguez plays more of a forward midfielder/winger whereas Quintero plays more in a neutral mid-center position. This means that he fully commits to a playmaker role, although he does contain remarkable dribbling ability and carries high accuracy with shots on goal

Due to his size, Quintero naturally has a lower center of gravity allowing him to have higher balance, agility, and speed similar to that of Lionel Messi. Despite many other young talents drawing comparisons to Messi as well, Quintero is highlighted to be a very 'close replica' to the point where he also been referenced to a 'Diego Maradona' as well. Although all these are natural comparisons due to the fact that he can also effectively run with the ball in limited spaces, and maintain a very sharp technical mindset to that of the Argentinean legends themselves. However, despite the comparisons, Quintero does not carry the strength of Maradona nor is he balanced with his weak foot like Messi.

Although, Quintero states that his main inspiration was from watching Brazilian legend Rivaldo as a child.

Career statistics

Club

International

Scores and results list Colombia's goal tally first.

Honours
Porto
Supertaça Cândido de Oliveira: 2013

River Plate
Supercopa Argentina: 2017
Copa Libertadores: 2018

Colombia U20
South American Youth Championship: 2013

Individual
2013 South American Youth Championship MVP
2013 FIFA U-20 World Cup Best goal of the tournament.

References

External links

Profile at Dimayor

1993 births
Living people
Footballers from Medellín
Association football midfielders
Colombian footballers
Colombia international footballers
Colombia under-20 international footballers
2014 FIFA World Cup players
Envigado F.C. players
Atlético Nacional footballers
Delfino Pescara 1936 players
FC Porto players
FC Porto B players
Stade Rennais F.C. players
Independiente Medellín footballers
Club Atlético River Plate footballers
Colombian expatriate footballers
Colombian expatriate sportspeople in Portugal
Expatriate footballers in Portugal
Categoría Primera A players
Serie A players
Primeira Liga players
Ligue 1 players
Argentine Primera División players
Expatriate footballers in Italy
Colombian expatriate sportspeople in Italy
Expatriate footballers in France
Colombian expatriate sportspeople in France
Expatriate footballers in Argentina
Colombian expatriate sportspeople in Argentina
2018 FIFA World Cup players